Allahverdi literally means "Allah gave". Allahverdi, and variants Alaverdi and Allah Verdi, may refer to:

People

Surname
 Javad Allahverdi, Iranian football player

Given name
 Allah Verdi Mirza Farman Farmaian (born 1929), Qajar prince
 Allahverdi Bagirov (1946–1992), Azerbaijani officer, former leader of Azerbaijani Popular Front Party, head coach of FK Qarabağ and National Hero of Azerbaijan
 Allahverdi Dehghani (born 1968), Iranian politician
 Allahverdi Khan (c. 1560–1613), Iranian general and statesman of Georgian origin
 Allahverdi Khan (Armenian) (died 1662), Safavid military officer of Armenian origin

Places in Iran
 Allah Verdi Kandi, Chaypareh
 Allah Verdi Kandi, Poldasht
 Cheshmeh-ye Allahverdi
 Owsaluy-e Allahverdi Khan

See also
 Allahverdi Khan Bridge, one of the eleven bridges in Isfahan, Iran
 Alaverdi (disambiguation)